Worth Township is the name of some places in the U.S. state of Pennsylvania:
Worth Township, Butler County, Pennsylvania
Worth Township, Centre County, Pennsylvania
Worth Township, Mercer County, Pennsylvania

Pennsylvania township disambiguation pages